The Elk Range is a mountain range of the Canadian Rockies, located on the southern edge of Kananaskis on the Alberta-British Columbia border. The range was named for elk found on the mountain slopes and in the nearby Elk River valley. Originally known as the Elk Mountains in 1917, the name was formally changed to the Elk Range in 1951.

This range includes the following mountains and peaks:

References

Mountain ranges of Alberta
Mountain ranges of British Columbia
Ranges of the Canadian Rockies